The NBA Development League Impact Player of the Year was an annual NBA Development League (D-League) award given between the 2007–08 and 2016–17 seasons to the player who joined the D-League mid-season and made the greatest contribution to his team's success following that acquisition. The league's head coaches determined the award by voting and it was usually presented to the honoree during the D-League playoffs.

While no player won Impact Player of the Year more than once, two international players won the award: Ike Diogu of Nigeria in 2014, and John Holland of Puerto Rico in 2017. Morris Almond was the inaugural winner while playing for the Utah Flash. By position, forwards have won the award five times, followed by guards with four. Only one center won, Brian Butch in 2009–10.

Winners

References

External links
D-League Impact Player of the Year Award Winners at basketball-reference.com

National Basketball Association lists
Impact Player
Awards established in 2008
Awards disestablished in 2017